Darius is a surname. Notable people with the surname include:

 Adam Darius (1930–2017), American mime, choreographer, and writer
 Donovin Darius (born 1975), American football player
 Steponas Darius (1896–1933), Lithuanian pilot

See also
 Darius (given name)